Kayla Day (born September 28, 1999) is an American professional tennis player. She has a career-high ranking of No. 122 by the Women's Tennis Association (WTA). As a junior, she won one junior Grand Slam title, at the 2016 US Open. There, she finished runner–up in the girls' doubles event, partnering with Caroline Dolehide. Despite having success as junior, Day is mostly spending time playing at the ITF Women's Circuit instead of WTA Tour, due to her ranking. She officially turned professional in 2017, at the Australian Open.

Early life and background
Kayla started playing tennis when she was seven years old. Her mother is from the Czech Republic.

Junior career
Kayla was No. 1 in the girls' 12s, 14s, 16s, and 18s US national rankings. In 2016, she climbed to No. 1 in the ITF junior rankings by winning the 2016 Junior US Open, reaching the semifinals at the 2016 Wimbledon, and reaching the final at the Orange Bowl the previous year. She also achieved her best doubles result at a major event as a runner-up at the 2016 Junior US Open with partner Caroline Dolehide. She won the 2016 Girls 18s National Championships to earn a wildcard into the main draw of the US Open. Kayla has been coached from the beginning by Larry Mousouris, who is also the coach of record to two other Junior US Open winners, Michael Falberg and Tim Triguero.

Professional career

2016-2017: Turned professional, first title, Grand Slam & Premier-level debut
Day made her WTA Tour debut at the Connecticut Open in New Haven, after reaching the main draw as a lucky loser, having defeated Naomi Broady and Kirsten Flipkens along the way. The following week, she played in her first career Grand Slam at the US Open and won her first match against compatriot Madison Brengle.

Shortly after turning 17, Day won her first career title at a $50k tournament in Macon, Georgia. The following week at Scottsdale, she reached the semifinals to enter the top 200 for the first time. With her combined performance at these two events, Day won the Australian Open Wild Card Challenge to earn a spot in the main draw at the first major event of 2017.

Day picked up her first WTA Tour wins of the season — and first wins of her career at a Premier Mandatory event — at the 2017 Indian Wells Open, including a victory over 2017 Australian Open semifinalist Mirjana Lučić-Baroni to reach the third round of the tournament.

2022: WTA 1000 level main-draw qualification
After almost five years of absence at the WTA 1000 level, she qualified for the main draw at the Guadalajara Open where she lost in the first round to Eugenie Bouchard.

Grand Slam performance timelines

Singles

Doubles

ITF Circuit finals

Singles: 8 (3 titles, 5 runner–ups)

Doubles: 3 (2 titles, 1 runner–up)

Junior Grand Slam finals

Girls' singles: 1 (title)

Girls' doubles: 1 (runner-up)

References

External links
 
 

Tennis people from California
Living people
1999 births
American female tennis players
US Open (tennis) junior champions
Sportspeople from Santa Barbara, California
American people of Czech descent
Grand Slam (tennis) champions in girls' singles
21st-century American women